FC Spartak-UGP Anapa was a Russian football team from Anapa. UGP stands for their sponsor, Gazprom subsidiary, Urengoygazprom. It existed from 1986 to early 2009 and played professionally from 1988 to 1998, 2001 to 2003 and 2005 to 2008 (including a stint in the Russian First Division in 1992 and 1993). In early 2009 it was dissolved due to financial problems. It was called Dynamo Anapa (1986–1987), Gekris Anapa (1995), FC Anapa (1998–1999) and Spartak Anapa (1988–1994, 1996–1997, 2000–2003).

External links
  Page at 2liga.ru

Association football clubs established in 1986
Association football clubs disestablished in 2009
Defunct football clubs in Russia
Sport in Krasnodar Krai
1986 establishments in Russia
2009 disestablishments in Russia